Maximiliano Martín Olivera de Andrea (born 5 March 1992) is a Uruguayan footballer who plays as a left-back for Liga MX club Juárez.

Club career
Olivera is a youth exponent from Montevideo Wanderers. He joined Peñarol in 2015. In 2016, he joined Italian side Fiorentina.

On 24 December 2018, Fiorentina announced he has been loaned to Olimpia in Paraguay.

On 5 February 2020, he joined Juárez in Mexico on loan.

On 19 July 2021, he returned to Juárez on a permanent basis.

Career statistics

References

Living people
1992 births
Association football defenders
Uruguayan footballers
Uruguay under-20 international footballers
Uruguayan expatriate footballers
Montevideo Wanderers F.C. players
Peñarol players
ACF Fiorentina players
Club Olimpia footballers
FC Juárez footballers
Uruguayan Primera División players
Serie A players
Paraguayan Primera División players
Liga MX players
Expatriate footballers in Italy
Expatriate footballers in Paraguay
Expatriate footballers in Mexico